Carry On is the first song on the album Déjà Vu, by the recording act Crosby, Stills, Nash & Young. Written by Stephen Stills, this song was released as the B-side of "Teach Your Children", and went on to receive steady airplay of its own from AOR radio stations.

The song
When nearing the end of the recording sessions for Déjà Vu, Graham Nash told Stephen Stills that they still didn't have an opening track. Many recording acts or producers prefer to start an album with a particularly catchy song, in order to set the mood and encourage listeners who are checking it out for the first time. Stills took two songs — (one being the song Questions he'd written for and recorded with Buffalo Springfield), and edited them together with parts of a jam session from a few days earlier, to produce one finished piece.

The song is noted for the Bridge section that makes a transition from a faster to slower tempo, with the lyric lines sung in Acapella: "Carry on,/ Love is coming,/ Love is coming to us all".

Session drummer Dallas Taylor:

The song was also an inspiration for Led Zeppelin, whose track "Friends" on Led Zeppelin III is generally seen as being inspired by it, including a similar slack-stringed C-tuned acoustic opening.

Personnel
Stephen Stills – vocals; guitars; bass; organ; percussion
David Crosby – vocals 
Graham Nash – vocals 
Dallas Taylor – drums

References

1969 songs
1970 singles
Crosby, Stills, Nash & Young songs
Songs written by Stephen Stills
Atlantic Records singles